Rudolf Piowaty (28 April 1900 - 29 January 1978) was a Czech swimmer. He competed in two events at the 1924 Summer Olympics in Paris.

Piowaty was Jewish. He was a member of Czechoslovak Army in the interwar period. In his free time he was perfecting his swimming skills in Jewish sport clubs Makabi Brno and Bar Kochba Brno.

In July 1942, three years into the occupation of Czechoslovakia by Nazi forces, he managed to escape from the Protectorate of Bohemia and Moravia to Switzerland, swimming through Bodensee from the German side. He spent the wartime in Geneva helping the Czech delegate at the League of Nations in the Information Office. After World War II, he returned to Czechoslovakia, where he continued to serve in the military. After the communist coup d'etat of 1948, Piowaty emigrated with the whole family to Canada, where he worked as a furniture merchant.

References

External links
 

1900 births
1978 deaths
Czech male swimmers
Olympic swimmers of Czechoslovakia
Swimmers at the 1924 Summer Olympics
Sportspeople from Brno
Czech Jews
Jewish sportspeople
Czechoslovak emigrants to Canada